Herbert Black Parkinson (11 September 1892 – 27 April 1947) was an English cricketer active from 1922 to 1923 who played for Lancashire. He was born and died in Barrow-in-Furness. He appeared in 15 first-class matches as a righthanded batsman and wicketkeeper. He scored 34 runs with a highest score of 8 and held 14 catches with three stumpings.

Notes

1892 births
1947 deaths
English cricketers
Lancashire cricketers